Shanta Chhetri is an Indian politician who is a leader of the All India Trinamool Congress party. She was elected unopposed to the Rajya Sabha on 31 July 2017. She is member of the All India Trinamool Congress Steering Committee.

References

Living people
Trinamool Congress politicians from West Bengal
Women members of the Rajya Sabha
Rajya Sabha members from West Bengal
1956 births
Indian Gorkhas
People from Darjeeling district